Crenicichla macrophthalma is a species of cichlid native to South America. It is found in Amazon River basin, in the Negro, Uatumã, Tapajós, Xingu and Trombetas River basins.

References

macrophthalma
Fish of the Amazon basin
Fish described in 1840
Taxa named by Johann Jakob Heckel